The South Africa International is an international badminton tournament held in South Africa organised by Badminton South Africa, sanctioned by Badminton World Federation (BWF) and Badminton Confederation of Africa (BCA). Since 2018, this tournament has been a BWF Future Series.

Previous winners

Performances by nation

References

External links
 Badminton South Africa
 Badminton Confederation of Africa

Badminton tournaments in South Africa
Badminton in South Africa